This partial list of city nicknames in Minnesota compiles the aliases, sobriquets and slogans that cities in Minnesota are known by (or have been known by historically), officially and unofficially, to municipal governments, local people, outsiders or their tourism boards or chambers of commerce. City nicknames can help in establishing a civic identity, helping outsiders recognize a community or attracting people to a community because of its nickname; promote civic pride; and build community unity. Nicknames and slogans that successfully create a new community "ideology or myth" are also believed to have economic value. Their economic value is difficult to measure, but there are anecdotal reports of cities that have achieved substantial economic benefits by "branding" themselves by adopting new slogans.

Some unofficial nicknames are positive, while others are derisive. The unofficial nicknames listed here have been in use for a long time or have gained wide currency.
Anoka – Halloween Capital of the World
Albert Lea – The Land Between the Lakes
Austin – Spamtown USAClaims to Fame - Favorites, Epodunk, accessed April 16, 2007.
Bemidji – First City on the Mississippi
Braham – Homemade Pie Capital of Minnesota
Duluth
The Zenith City
The Twin Ports (with Superior, Wisconsin)
Elk River – Where City and Country Flow Together
Hanover – The Little City on the Crow
Hermantown – The City of Quality Living
International Falls – The Icebox of the United States
Lake Benton – Windpower Capital
Madison – Lutefisk Capital of the WorldCity of Madison, Minnesota - Welcome to the City of Madison, Minnesota
Minneapolis
City of Flour and Sawdust (reported in 1883)
City of LakesCity of Minneapolis, Minnesota - Official Web Site
Mill City
The Mini Apple
Murderapolis
The Twin Cities (with St. Paul)
Montgomery – Kolacky Capital of the World
Mountain Iron – Taconite Capital of the World
New Ulm – The City of Charm and Tradition
Northfield – Cows, Colleges and Contentment
Preston – America's Trout Capital
Richfield – Poorfield
Robbinsdale – Birdtown
Rochester – Med City
St. Cloud – Granite City
St. Louis Park – St. Jewish Park
Saint Paul
Pigs Eye (the city's original name – see Pierre "Pig's Eye" Parrant for details)
Hockeytown
Saintly City
The Twin Cities (with Minneapolis)
Stillwater – The Birthplace of Minnesota
Warroad – Hockeytown
Worthington – Turkey Capital of the World

See also
List of city nicknames in the United States

References

Minnesota cities and towns
Populated places in Minnesota
City nicknames